McQuaid Jesuit High School is an all-male, Catholic, Jesuit, college preparatory school run by the USA Northeast Jesuit province of the Society of Jesus in the metropolitan area of Rochester, New York. The school is named Named after Bernard J. McQuaid, the first bishop of the Roman Catholic Diocese of Rochester. McQuaid is located at 1800 Clinton Avenue South, in the suburb of Brighton.

History
During the late 1870s, Bishop Bernard McQuaid had tried to convince the Jesuits to found an institution of learning in his diocese. In 1954, McQuaid Jesuit High School opened its doors to 129 young men.

On June 23, 1953, the ground was broken on the 33-acre campus, and the first school building was completed by September 1955. The total construction cost exceeded $2.5 million. While the new school was under construction, classes were held in the former St. Andrew's Seminary building in Rochester. There, the first class of McQuaid Jesuit, which comprised 196 students, was admitted on September 8, 1954. The second school year was held in the current complex, and the school has been in continual operation since that then.

McQuaid began to admit eighth graders in 1967; seventh graders in 1993; and sixth graders in 2012. As of 2012, McQuaid operates as a middle and high school.

Notable alumni
Tom Deckman - Stage and television actor
Teddy Geiger - Singer, songwriter, and producer
Frank Paul Geraci, Jr. - Judge of the U.S. District Court for the Western District of New York
Michael C. Green - District Attorney for Monroe County
Jack Leasure - Professional basketball player, Coach of McQuaid Varsity Basketball
Brodie Lee (Jon Huber) - American professional wrestler
Charlie Lowell - Musician Jars of Clay
Matt Odmark - Musician Jars of Clay
Ryan Pettinella - Professional basketball player
C. J. Rapp - Founder of Jolt Cola
Marty Reasoner - Professional NHL hockey player for the New York Islanders 
John Ryan (musician) - Singer, songwriter, producer, and instrumentalist
David Schickler - Author
Isaiah Stewart - 1st round draft pick and professional basketball player for the Detroit Pistons of the NBA
Tyler Relph - Professional basketball player
Robert R. Thomas - Chief Justice of the Supreme Court of Illinois and former professional football player
Danny Wegman - CEO, Wegmans Food Market
Neil Pappalardo - Founder of MEDITECH

Notable faculty members

William J. O'Malley - Actor and technical adviser in The Exorcist; author of several theological texts
Jeff Van Gundy - Former basketball coach for the New York Knicks and the Houston Rockets, began his coaching career at McQuaid in the 1985–1986 season

References

External links

1954 establishments in New York (state)
Boys' schools in New York (state)
Educational institutions established in 1954
Jesuit high schools in the United States
Private middle schools in New York (state)
High schools in Monroe County, New York
Roman Catholic Diocese of Rochester
Catholic secondary schools in New York (state)